Selyatyn is a village in Vyzhnytsia Raion, Chernivtsi Oblast, Ukraine. It hosts the administration of Seliatyn rural hromada, one of the hromadas of Ukraine.

Until 18 July 2020, Seliatyn belonged to Putyla Raion. The raion was abolished in July 2020 as part of the administrative reform of Ukraine, which reduced the number of raions of Chernivtsi Oblast to three. The area of Putyla Raion was merged into Vyzhnytsia Raion.

Climate

References

Villages in Vyzhnytsia Raion